Ottawa Hills High School may refer to:

Ottawa Hills High School (Michigan)
Ottawa Hills High School (Ohio)